The 2020 Potchefstroom Open was a professional tennis tournament played on hard courts. It was the first edition of the tournament which was part of the 2020 ATP Challenger Tour. It took place in Potchefstroom, South Africa between 10 and 15 March 2020. The tournament was canceled prior to completion due to the coronavirus pandemic.

Singles main-draw entrants

Seeds

 1 Rankings are as of March 2, 2020.

Other entrants
The following players received wildcards into the singles main draw:
  Gerhardt Marius Becker
  Vaughn Hunter
  Khololwam Montsi

The following players received entry from the qualifying draw:
  Fabrizio Ornago
  Sebastian Prechtel
  Fabien Reboul
  Mehluli Don Ayanda Sibanda
  Jean Thirouin
  Mick Veldheer

Champions

Singles

tournament canceled

Doubles

tournament canceled

References

2020 ATP Challenger Tour
2020 in South African tennis
March 2020 sports events in Africa
Sports events curtailed due to the COVID-19 pandemic
Tennis tournaments in South Africa